Archibald Campbell (18 January 1862 – 4 November 1943) was a politician from Alberta, Canada.

Campbell was elected to the Legislative Assembly of Alberta in the 1909 Alberta general election. He defeated Conservative party candidate A.R. Aldridge in a landslide victory.

Campbell resigned his seat on 8 June 1910 to provide an electoral district for Premier Arthur Lewis Sifton to run in.

References

External links
Legislative Assembly of Alberta Members Listing

Alberta Liberal Party MLAs
1862 births
1943 deaths